Joseph Pepe may refer to:

 Joseph Pepé (1881–1970), English sport shooter
 Joseph A. Pepe (born 1942), American prelate of the Roman Catholic Church